Leming is an unincorporated community and census-designated place in Atascosa County, Texas, United States. As of the 2010 census it had a population of 946. This was a new CDP for the 2010 census. The community is part of the San Antonio Metropolitan Statistical Area. Leming has a post office with the ZIP code 78050.

Geography
Leming is located at  (29.068341, -98.472227).

References

Census-designated places in Atascosa County, Texas
Census-designated places in Texas
Unincorporated communities in Atascosa County, Texas
Unincorporated communities in Texas
Greater San Antonio